The Nikon D3200 is a 24.2-megapixel DX format DSLR Nikon F-mount camera officially launched by Nikon on April 19, 2012.
It is marketed as an entry-level DSLR camera for beginners and experienced DSLR hobbyists who are ready for more advanced specs and performance.

The guide mode, with integrated tutorials, is especially useful for beginners. The D3200 replaces the D3100 as Nikon's entry level DSLR, but its improved image quality has been compared to that of pro DSLRs. Based on DxOMark, the Nikon D3200 entry-level crop DSLR surpassed the DxOMark Overall Sensor Score of the fullframe Canon EOS 5D Mark II, although 5D Mark II was state-of-the-art when it was launched four years before.

Its successor is the Nikon D3300 announced in January 2014 with new Nikon Expeed 4 image processor, without optical low pass filter (OLPF), 5 fps and the Nikon's first DSLR camera with Easy (sweep) Panorama. As in the Nikon D5300, the carbon-fiber-reinforced polymer body and also the new retractable kit lens makes it smaller and lighter.

Features
 24.2 (total 24.7) megapixel DX-format CMOS sensor with 12 bit resolution, made by Nikon
 1080p Full HD movie mode
 Nikon Expeed 3 image/video processor
 Active D-Lighting
 Automatic chromatic aberration correction
 Image Sensor Cleaning function by vibrations and Airflow Control System
 Image area Pixels is the DX Format which can be adjusted to (Large) 6,016 × 4,000 (Medium) 4,512 × 3,000 (Small) 3,008 × 2,000
 Storage media is either SD, SDHC or SDXC, UHS-I bus mode, and Eye-Fi Wireless LAN
 GPS interface for direct geotagging supported by Nikon GP-1

Wide dynamic range versus automatic exposure bracketing

The dynamic range of the Nikon D3200 (Expeed 3 named Expeed 2 type, 14 bits reduced to 12 bits) exceeds even full-frame DSLRs like Nikon D3S (Expeed 2 named Expeed (1) type, 14 bits) or Canon 5D MK3 (DIGIC 5+, 14 bits) at low film speeds (ISO 100 and ISO 200) due to reduced effective resolution of the analog-to-digital converters.

The D3200 does not have automatic exposure bracketing. The very high dynamic range of the Nikon D3200 makes it possible to shoot high dynamic range images (HDR, mostly created by combining multiple images with different exposures) with one shot, especially when using raw image format. The one-shot HDR method also avoids disadvantages like blurring, ghost images or other errors when merging multiple images.

Reception
DxO Labs awarded its sensor an overall score of 81, partly due to a very wide dynamic range. At time of testing the second-highest result of all APS-C DSLRs in the DxO Labs/DxOMark sensor rating was achieved, above that of much more expensive competitors. Digital Photography Review awarded the camera a score of 73% earning it a "silver award", praising the versatility and value while also noting its "slow AF" and lack of in-camera filter effects. TechRadar gave it a score of 4/5, citing the camera's guide mode and sensor as its strong points and its "odd colours" on the LCD screen as its weakest. T3 magazine called the D3200 "one of the best beginner DSLRs around", stating that while "slightly pricey" and with some LCD screen problems, the guide mode and "excellent picture quality" make it "great if you're a DSLR beginner looking for a friendly camera".

See also
 List of Nikon F-mount lenses with integrated autofocus motor – autofocusing is only available with one of these currently 162 lenses, as the D3200 lacks an autofocus motor, but includes an electronic rangefinder.

References

External links

 Nikon D3200 Manual Nikon
 
 

D3200
D3200
Cameras introduced in 2012
Live-preview digital cameras